The Newcastle Rugby League is a local rugby league football competition in Newcastle, Australia. It is one of the oldest rugby league competitions in Australia, founded in 1910. A Newcastle representative team was also assembled from players in the League during most of the 20th century. The first grade competition also comprises the NSWRL Presidents Cup Northern Conference.

History
A Newcastle team competed in the inaugural New South Wales Rugby League premiership of 1908 but withdrew after the 1909 season to form the local competition under the banner of the Northern Branch of the NSWRL.

The four original teams were Central Newcastle (Blue & White), Northern Suburbs (Light & Dark Blue vertical stripes), South Newcastle (Red & White) and Western Suburbs (Red & Green). The season kicked off 14 May 1910 with South playing West and Central playing Northern Suburbs. South Newcastle finished the season on top of the ladder; the final was played in front of 2500 spectators at Hamilton League Ground, with Central overcoming South 13–4.

The 1911 season saw the previous minor premiers South slump to the bottom of the ladder. The final was played in front of 4000 spectators and saw North victorious over Central 10–2.
1911 saw the Combined Newcastle & Hunter team Tour Queensland, defeating the Queensland State team in all matches played.
Newcastle played against the touring New Zealand team in a tight match almost pulling off an upset before going down 21–20.

The 1912 season saw the addition of Eastern Suburbs, playing in Black and White. They were immediately competitive and made the grand final.

The First World War saw a halt to the competition for 1917 and 1918. Although the Newcastle Morning Herald did continue to publish results for competition games for those two years. The NSW Football League sacked most of the local officials following an early game of the 1917 season in which the Western Suburbs Club played a disqualified player. The competition was thrown into turmoil and the season was abandoned. The 1918 season was also abandoned because the officials were still serving their suspensions and the player shortage had worsened. 

1919 saw a split, with two smaller competitions held – the "Lilywhites" or clubs faithful to the NSWRL, composed of Eastern Suburbs and Northern Suburbs, and the "Bolsheviks" or rebels composed of South, Central, North and West.

1920 saw the competition reunited when the Newcastle Rugby League (NRL) was officially formed and expanded to six teams as Kurri Kurri competed for the first time. The Newcastle Sports Ground (No1) was officially opened 16th September 1922 on land donated by the Australian Agricultural Company. The opening was marked between Western Suburbs (Sydney) and a Newcastle representative side, with Newcastle winning 20-16. The first game under lights was played at the Newcastle Coursing and Sporting Club (later the Newcastle Greyhound track) at Hamilton South in 1928.

The 1930s saw the emergence of the Coalfields teams (such as Cessnock Goannas in 1930). Football games were first broadcast on the radio in this decade, but only after considerable debate by Newcastle Rugby League. The record score was established in this decade on the 27th July 1939, when Northern Suburbs defeated Morpeth-East Maitland 127-16. North winger Alf Fairhall scored 11 tries and kicked 14 goals, with the game called off 20 minutes early. 

The Country Rugby League (CRL) formed in 1934 and became the governing body for the sport of rugby league in areas of New South Wales outside the Sydney metropolitan area, such as Newcastle. 

In the mid 1950s,the major football clubs were opening large licensed Social Clubs. Bar and poker machine revenue from these clubs provided a new source of cash to fund and develop the game. Also in this era, the 'six-yard rule' was introduced to keep both the attacking and defending teams from being within three yards of the play the ball. 

Prior to 1960, if the minor premiers were defeated in the playoffs, they then had the right to challenge the winner of the final to a grand final match. The Second Division competition started in 1960 with nine teams, growing to 23 for the 1961 season. Macquarie also entered the league in 1960. In 1962, the local Television station (NBN 3) began transmitting to Newcastle audiences. 

From 1963 to 1965, the Newcastle representative team won 15 consecutive matches, including wins in three Country Championships and wins against South Africa and France, and the famous victories in the State Cup. This Cup, in which Sydney teams played NSW Country Divisional teams in a knockout competition, was launched in 1964 by the NSWRL. Newcastle defeated South Sydney, North Sydney, the all-conquering St George and Parramatta to win the Cup. This side featured names such as Terry Pannowitz, Allan Buman, and Dave Brown (captain). 

In 1968, the Central Newcastle club relocated from the inner-city to Charlestown and became Central-Charlestown, popularly known as 'The Butcher Boys'. 

During the 1970s, the ten District clubs engaged in an impressive line-up of high profile Captain/Coaches. Great Britain international Terry Clawson (South Newcastle), immortal and Australian international Johnny Raper (Western Suburbs), Australian international Brian 'Chicka' Moore (Macquarie) and Australian international Alan Thomson (Lakes United), to name a few. In 1971, the 'six tackle rule' was introduced. In 1978, foundation club Northern Suburbs became North Newcastle after it enlarged its district to include Raymond Terrace and Nelson Bay. 

In 1988, the league changed majorly with the introduction of the Newcastle Knights into the NSWRL competition, the first representation of the Newcastle and Hunter region since the Newcastle Rebels departed after the 1909 season. 

As a result, the 1990s saw the Newcastle Knights attract the lion's share of the spectators in Newcastle and support for local clubs suffered. This downturn was offset to a certain extent when former Knights players began to filter into the local competition. The drift of players boosted the profile of the local league, which was no more evident than when Steve Linnane led Kurri to a trifecta of premierships in 1993, 1994 and 1995. 

The 2000s saw the league implement a 'salary cap' and a 'points system' for players signing with a 'new' club. This innovation was designed to control spending and to keep clubs alive and well. A joint venture launched in 2009 by the Knights and the Newcastle Rugby League was labelled 'the Player Placement Program', designed to allow Knights players not required by their club on a weekend, to play in the local competition.

2020 saw the competition cancelled for the first time in over one hundred years due to the COVID-19 pandemic. With restrictions easing, a decision was made to implement a two tiered amateur competition. First Grade would feature Lakes United, Western Suburbs, Cessnock, Maitland, Central and Souths. Reserve Grade would see representation from Western Suburbs, Lakes United, Cessnock, Maitland, Central, Souths and Kurri Kurri. Of further note, Maitland also elected to participate in the Presidents Cup, spreading their resources across the two Newcastle competitions as well as the New South Wales based Presidents Cup, which they won. Cessnock defeated South Newcastle in the First Grade Grand Final.

The 2021 season featured the regular clubs, as well as both Wyong and The Entrance, forming a 10 team, 18 round competition. The Entrance will contest the competition for the first time in their history. As well as this, the Major Premiers also now advance to meet title winners from Illawarra, Ron Massey Cup and a wildcard in a conference style President's Cup at the end of the year. Unfortunately, the competition was interrupted by COVID-19 restrictions placed on the Hunter region, with a decision made to cancel the competition prior to any finals being played. Maitland Pickers had secured the Minor Premiership, but there would be no Major Premiers for season 2021. No President's Cup tournament was contested.

Season 2022 saw the Maitland Pickers claim the minor premiership with 31 competition points,  with Central Newcastle (29), Macquarie Scorpions (22), Cessnock Goannas (22) and South Newcastle (22) rounding out the top five. On the 11th September 2022, Maitland Pickers claimed their 13th premiership with a 40-4 victory over Macquarie Scorpions at McDonald Jones Stadium in Newcastle. On 25th September 2022, Maitland defended their Presidents Cup crown with a 36-12 win over The Hills Bulls. 2022 NSWRL Presidents Cup. 

Season 2023 will include The Northern Hawks, bumping the number of teams in the league to 11. All teams will compete in the overarching 2023 NSWRL Presidents Cup. 2023 will also see the modern-day version of the Newcastle Rebels, a team constructed of the best talent from the Newcastle Rugby League, return to the Men's Country Championships.

Current clubs
 Central Charlestown Butcher Boys
(formerly Central Charlestown & Central Newcastle – moved to Charlestown in the early 1960s)
Nickname: Butcher Boys
Home Ground: St John Oval, Charlestown (played at Passmore Oval, Wickham in 2008; Central Newcastle played at Learmonth Park, Hamilton, before merging with Charlestown)
Joined competition: 1910
Premierships: 1910 1921 1928 1930 1937 1939 1949 (7)
 Cessnock
Nickname: Goannas
Home Ground: Cessnock Sportsground, Cessnock (formerly Old Cessnock Sportsground, where Big W currently stands, prior 2004)
Joined competition: 1930
Premierships: 1941 1950 1954 1955 1960 1972 1977 2003 2020* (9)
 Kurri Kurri
Nickname: Bulldogs
Home Ground: Kurri Sportsground "The Graveyard", Kurri Kurri
Joined competition: 1920 (club formed in 1911)
Premierships: 1931 1940 1945 1993 1994 1995 (6)
 Lakes United
Nickname: Seagulls
Home Ground: Cahill Oval, Belmont
Joined competition: 1947
Premierships: 1947 1974 1975 1985 1986 1987 1996 2001 2006 2007 2015 (11)
 Macquarie
(formerly Macquarie United and Toronto Workers)
Nickname: Scorpions
Home Ground: Lyall Peacock Field, Toronto
Joined competition: 1960
Premierships: 1991 2017 (2)
 Maitland
(originally Maitland United – merged with Morpeth-East Maitland in 1942)
Nickname: Pickers (formerly Pumpkin Pickers)
Homeground: Maitland Sportsground, Maitland (formerly Coronation Oval, Telarah for 2 years while Maitland Sportsground was rebuilt)
Years in competition: 1925–2003; 2005–2007; 2009–
Premierships: 1933 1934 1956 1957 1958 1965 1969 1971 1973 1983 2010 2011 2022 (13)
 Northern Hawks
Successor to Northern Suburbs, original Northern & Port Stephens
Nickname: Hawks 
Home Ground: Tomaree Sporting Complex, Nelson Bay
Years in competition: 2021-
Premierships: (Reserves 2022)
 South Newcastle
Nickname: Lions
Home Ground: Townson Oval, Merewether
Joined competition: 1910
Premierships: 1927 1943 1946 1963 1964 1968 1976 1988 1989 2016 2018 (11)
 Western Suburbs
Nickname: Rosellas or the Maggots
Home Ground: Harker Oval, New Lambton
Joined competition: 1910
Premierships: 1912 1915 1916 1922 1961 1966 1970 1978 1980 1981 1982 1984 1992 1997 1998 1999 2002 2004 2008 2012 2013 2014 2019 (23)
 Wyong
Nickname: Roos (mascot is a Kangaroo)
Home Ground: Morrie Breen Oval, Wyong
Years in competition: 2003–2012 & 2020–present
Premierships: 2009 (1)
 The Entrance
Nickname: Tigers 
Home Ground: EDSACC Oval, Bateau Bay
Years in competition: 2021-onward
Premierships: 0

Former clubs
 Eastern Suburbs
Nickname: Unknown
Home Ground: Newcastle No. 1 Sportsground, Newcastle West (also played at Wickham Oval, Wickham & Lynn Oval, Stockton)
Years in competition: 1912–1942
Premierships: 1913 1923 1924 1932 (4)
 Northern
(also North-Nelson Bay Marlins, Northern Blues and Nelson Bay Blues); successor to Northern Suburbs 
Nickname: Blues (mascot is a Marlin)
Home Ground: Tomaree Sporting Complex, Nelson Bay
Years in competition: 1989–2011
Premierships: 2005 (1)
 Northern Suburbs
Nickname: Bluebags
Homeground: Passmore Oval, Wickham
Years in competition: 1910–1988 (re-located to Nelson Bay as North-Nelson Bay) (now play in Newcastle & Hunter Rugby League)
Premierships: 1911 1914 1920 1925 1926 1929 1935 1938 1948 1951 1953 1959 1962 1967 1979 (15)
 Port Stephens
Successor to Northern
Nickname: Sharks
Home Ground: Tomaree Sporting Complex, Nelson Bay and Lakeside Oval, Raymond Terrace
Years in competition: 2012-2014
Premierships:
  Waratah Mayfield 
Nickname: Cheetahs
Home Ground: Waratah Oval, Waratah
Years in competition: 1927–2001; 2003–2004 (now play in Newcastle & Hunter Rugby League)
Premierships: 1936 1942 1944 1952 1990 2000 (6)
 Raymond Terrace
Nickname: Magpies
Home Ground: Lakeside Oval, Raymond Terrace
Years in competition: 2001–2008 (now play in Newcastle & Hunter Rugby League)
Premierships: nil
1919 featured a combined Rebel team (South Newcastle/Central Newcastle) who won the competition.

Premiers
Past winners of the Newcastle RL Premiership

Team of the Century
In 2008, rugby league football's centennial year in Australia, the Newcastle Rugby League named its 'Team of the Century':
Clive Churchill (Central)
Eddie Lumsden (Kurri Kurri)
Ron Bailey (Waratah-Mayfield)
Brian Carlson (North)
Johnny Graves (Maitland)
Bob Banks (Central)
Andrew Johns (Cessnock)
Paul Harragon (Lakes United)
Allan Buman (West)
Jim Gibbs (South)
Don Schofield (Cessnock)
Herb Narvo (North)
(c) Wally Prigg (West)
John Sattler (Kurri Kurri)
Albert Paul (Lakes United)
Matthew Gidley (West)
Les Johns (South)

See also

Rugby League Competitions in Australia
Rugby league in New South Wales

References

External links
 
 Ryan, Graham & Betty et al., Newcastle Knights 1988: Collectors Edition, Macquarie Publications, Dubbo, 1988.
 Pat "Nimmo" Walsh Family archive Newspaper Match Reports.

1910 establishments in Australia
Newcastle Knights
Recurring sporting events established in 1910
Rugby league competitions in New South Wales
Rugby league in Newcastle, New South Wales
Sports leagues established in 1910